Silk Road Group is a privately held investment company, owned and run by Georgian and European partners.

History
"Silk Road Group" was founded in 1997 by George Ramishvili. The company owns Silknet, the largest fixed-line, cable TV, broadband, and IPTV provider in Georgia along with GeoCell the Georgian mobile phone network.

The company is a force behind the restoration of the winery and palace at Tsinandali and the launch of a classical music festival there.

References

Investment companies of Georgia (country)